World Wheelchair Rugby Championships is an international wheelchair rugby competition contested by the national teams of the members of World Wheelchair Rugby (WWR), the sport's global governing body.

The first Wheelchair Rugby World Championships was held in Notwil, Switzerland in 1995.

Results

Summaries

Medal table

Participating nations

See also
IWRF Americas Championship
IWRF Asia-Oceania Championship
IWRF European Championship

References

External links
International Wheelchair Rugby Federation (IWRF)
Push 2010WWRC Commercial at the 2010WWRC's YouTube channel

World Championships
Wheelchair rugby
Recurring sporting events established in 1995